The direct repeat 1 (dr1) element is an RNA element commonly found in the 3' UTR of Avian sarcoma, Rous sarcoma and Avian leukosis viruses (Alpharetroviruses and Avian type C retroviruses). dr1 is required for efficient viral replication and is thought to be involved in genomic RNA packaging although this may not be its only role.

References

External links 
 

Cis-regulatory RNA elements
Alpharetroviruses